Singam Rojen Singh (born 20 March 1988) is an Indian footballer who plays as a defender for Sporting Clube de Goa in the I-League.

References

Indian footballers
1988 births
Living people
Sporting Clube de Goa players
Footballers from Manipur
Association football defenders